Noël Bernard may refer to:
 Noël Bernard (botanist) (1874–1911), French botanist
 Noël Bernard (journalist) (1925–1981), Romanian journalist
 Noël Bernard (Malecite leader), Malecite leader in New Brunswick, Canada